Doctor Syn Returns is the third in the series of Doctor Syn novels by Russell Thorndike. It tells the story of Syn, who has tired of piracy, tries to settle down as the vicar of the little town of Dymchurch in Kent, England.

Syn's attempt to live an obscure life fails when he is drawn into the local smuggling trade.  To protect his parishioners from the agents of the King's Revenue Syn becomes the masked Scarecrow of Romney Marsh and becomes leader of the smugglers.  He is one of the first costumed heroes in literature and is clearly inspired by earlier characters such as the Scarlet Pimpernel and Robin Hood.

Doctor Syn Returns was published in 1935.  It follows Doctor Syn on the High Seas and is followed by Further Adventures of Doctor Syn.

1935 British novels
Historical novels
Novels set in Kent
Novels by Russell Thorndike
Rich & Cowan books